Mulberry High School may refer to:

 Mulberry High School (Arkansas), Mulberry, Arkansas, USA
 Mulberry High School (Florida), Mulberry, Florida, USA